A list of notable films produced in Greece in the 1980s.

1980s

External links
 Greek film at the IMDb

1980s
Greek
Films